The 1971–72 DFB-Pokal was the 29th season of the annual German football cup competition. It began on 4 December 1971 and ended on 1 July 1972. 32 teams competed in the tournament of five rounds. In the final Schalke 04 defeated 1. FC Kaiserslautern 5–0, the largest margin by which a DFB-Pokal final was ever decided.

Mode
The tournament consisted of five rounds. In each round other than the final the games were held over two legs, with the team winning on aggregate advancing to the next round. In case the score was level after two legs, the second game was extended by 30 minutes of extra time. If still no winner could be determined a Penalty shoot-out decided which team advanced to the next round.

The final was held over one leg with 30 minutes of extra time in case the game was a draw after regular time. If the score was still level the game was replayed with 30 minutes of extra time in case of another draw. If still no winner could be determined, a penalty shoot-out decided the winner of the cup.

Matches

First round

Round of 16

Quarter-finals

Semi-finals

Final

References

External links
 Official site of the DFB 
 Kicker.de 
 1972 results at Fussballdaten.de 
 1972 results at Weltfussball.de 

1971-72
1971–72 in German football cups